Batman: Shadow of the Bat was a comic book series featuring Batman, published by DC Comics. The series ran for 96 issues, from 1992 to 2000. The stories took place in Batman's then-current continuity along with Detective Comics and Batman, in contrast to Batman: Legends of the Dark Knight, which focused on Batman's early years. Batman: Shadow of the Bat looked into the psyche of the various cast members of the Batman comics. It was also notable for introducing the villain Victor Zsasz into the Batman mythos.

The majority of issues were written by Alan Grant, who had previously been the main writer on Detective Comics from issue #583 to #621 (cover-dated February 1988 to September 1990) and on Batman from issue #455 to #480 (cover-dated October 1990 to Late June 1992).

Publication history
Batman: Shadow of the Bat #1 (cover-dated June 1992) went on sale three weeks after Alan Grant's final issue of Batman. Its first story arc, the four-part storyline "Batman: The Last Arkham", saw the introduction of several new characters such as Jeremiah Arkham and Victor Zsasz. 

Fifty of the series' 96 monthly issues were part of various crossovers with other titles. Issues #16-30 tied into the "Knightfall" storyline. Issues #73 and #74 were a part of the "Batman: Cataclysm" storyline, which was a top vote-getter for the Comics Buyer's Guide Fan Award for Favorite Story for 1999. Issue #80 was part of a special "flip-book" along with Azrael #47, where both issues were part of the same book. The #1,000,000 issue was a part of the "DC One Million" storyline, which was a top vote-getter for the Comics Buyer's Guide Fan Award for Favorite Story for 1999. Issues #83 through #94 were parts of the "No Man's Land" storyline that won the Comics Buyer's Guide Fan Award for Favorite Story of 2000. 

Grant's run as writer ended with issue #82, before the series was integrated into the year-long crossover storyline "Batman: No Man's Land". Afterward, the series was written by a variety of writers. Batman: Shadow of the Bat was canceled at the end of "No Man's Land" and was immediately replaced with the new series Batman: Gotham Knights.

Collected editions
The first four issues of the series were collected in Batman: The Last Arkham, and various other issues have been included, among other titles, in a number of trade paperbacks. In more recent times, DC Comics have been publishing this material in new, thicker trade paperbacks. This includes four volumes of Shadow of the Bat, through new editions of No Man's Land. In 2017, DC started publishing oversized hardcover editions of the event Knightfall, in three volumes, which collect many issues of the series.

References

Comics Buyer's Guide Fan Awards

External links

1992 comics debuts

de:Batman (Comicseries)#Batman: Shadow of the Bat